The Front of Patriotic Action (FAP) is a political party in Mozambique. 
In the 1999 general elections, the FAP participated in the RENAMO-EU electoral alliance alongside Mozambique's former rebel group RENAMO and nine other small opposition parties.

References

Political parties in Mozambique